Local Dance in the Philippines has played a tremendous role in Filipino culture. From one of the oldest dated dances called the Tinikling, to other folkloric dances such as the Pandanggo, Cariñosa, and Subli, and even to more modern-day dances like the ballet, it is no doubt that dance in the Philippine setting has integrated itself in society over the course of many years and is significantly imbedded in culture. Each of these dances originated in a unique way and serve a certain purpose, showcasing how diverse Philippine dances are now. Furthermore, Philippines nowadays dance was classic and innovative because of the modern period during this time many Filipino artist dancer are create an innovative steps and style to make it creative and new version of dance.

Types of dances by ethnic group 
The following are various indigenous dances of the major ethnic groupings of the Philippines

Igorot 
There are six Igorot ethnolinguistic tribes living in Luzon's mountain terrains: the Bontoc, Ifugao, Benguet, Apayo, and the Kalinga tribes, which retained much of their anito religions. Their lives have been centered on appeasing their gods and maintaining a harmonious relationship between spirits and man. Dances are usually linked to rituals for a good harvest, health, prayers for peace, and safety in war.

Moro 
The Moro people are the various usually unrelated Muslim Filipino ethnic groups. Most of their dances are marked by intricate hand and arm movements, accompanied by instruments such as the agong and kulintang.

Lumad 
The non-Islamized natives of Mindanao are collectively known as the Lumad people. Like the Igorot, they still retain much of their animistic anito religions.

Christianized Filipinos 
The majority of Filipinos are the Christianized lowlanders of the islands. Their dances are heavily influenced by Spanish culture, though still retaining native aspects. The dances range from courtship dances, to fiesta (festival) dances, to performance dances. The traditional attire in these dances include the balintawak and patadyong skirts for the women, and camisa de chino and colored trousers for the men.

Impact of societal functions to choreography 
Other less common presentations of Philippine dances have been categorized by intention, or societal functions. Philippine dances not only convey the artistry of movement, but are often associated with life-functions such as weddings, the mimicry of birds, or even rituals like the warding of evil spirits. This outlook on dance can be separated into the following categories:

Ritualistic dances 

Filipino rituals are based on the belief that there exists a delicate balance between man and nature, and the spirit world; and that it is through rituals that we can restore, enhance or maintain this balance. It clarifies our place in the universe; each gesture and move in the dance are symbolically articulating the role of man and human in the world. The dances contain narratives which illustrate the contractual obligations governing relationships between mankind, nature and the spirits. Because there are innumerable reasons for why and how humans can cause shifts in the balance or forget their place in the grander scheme, there are also innumerable rituals that can correct or address the concerns. Thus, it is in looking at their intentions that it can be better understood, interpreted and classified. Some of the rituals attempt to define the future, appease spirits, ask for good harvests, invoke protection, heal the sick, asking for good luck, guidance and counsel. Almost every facet of Filipino life is linked to a ritual practice and is an indication of the value and pervasiveness of rituals in folk culture.

Filipino rituals are often shown in dance, because for Filipinos, dance is the highest symbolic form. It transcends language and is able to convey emotions, collective memory, and articulate their purpose. Dance in this case, is the fundamental expression of their complex message and intention. Aside from ritualistic dance as a way to convey their request to the gods or spirits, it also reaffirms social roles in village hierarchies. The leaders of the dances are the masters of the village's collective memory and knowledge and subsequently, commands the highest respect and status.

Forms 
Rituals have been greatly influenced by rich colonial history, as well as archipelagic geography. As a result of this, each major geographic area such preserved distinct traditions, some preserving pre-colonial influences, while others were integrated or completely changed. Islam was deeply rooted in Mindanaoan culture long before Spanish colonist arrived and were mostly left untouched from the presence of Colonial Authorities, thus they continued to keep their mythic Islamic practices. Unlike the Filipinos of the lowlands, who integrated Christian and Catholic practices to form a uniquely Filipino folk Christianity which is still practiced today.

Structure 
As rituals are mostly in the form of dances, it uses gestures, incantations and symbolic implements to invoke spirits, to restore balance or to ask for intercession for harvests, good marriages, safety in journey or counsel. Rituals then, have 2 intended audiences, the spirits who are summoned to placate their anger or to call for their participation to restore balance and to care and provide for mankind. The second audience are the practitioners. In carrying out the rituals, they are reflecting and passing on the collective knowledge and memory of the village, which have been accumulated and refined across many generations. It is through the use of dramatic gestures and dance that symbolic narratives, their values and beliefs are recorded and safeguarded from forgetting. The performance of ritual dances is ultimately an act of recollection. It is a reminder for men and spirit their duties and responsibility in restoring the world's balance. And within the dance itself, practitioners are reminded of the significance of the past, and are being prepared to accommodate the uncertainties that the present and future may bring.

Functions 
Dancing for Filipinos have always imitated nature and life, and is seen as a form of spiritual and social expression. Birds, mountains, seas and straits have become inspiration for local dances. The tinikling mimic the rice-preying birds, the itik-itik is reminiscent of its namesake the duck, the courtship dances of the Cordillera are inspired by hawk-like movements.

Geographic location also influence what movements are incorporated into the dances. People from Maranao, Maguindanaon, Bagobo, Manobo, T’boli of Mindanao and Tausug and Badjao of Sulu. Draw influences from aquatic life as they are near bodies of water and have lived their lives mostly off-shore. Their dances accompanies by chants, songs and instruments like the kulintang, gong, gabbang and haglong, as well as a variety of drums show their zest for life.  

Some rituals are used as religious expressions to honor the spirits and ask for blessings in each facet of life, such as birth, illness, planting, harvest or even death. They believe in diwatas, or spirits dwelling in nature, which can be appeased through offerings and dance as a means to commune with the spirit.

Dance over the years 

To better understand these dances, the time period of these dances must be considered. Depending on each period, they have had their own ways of influencing and inspiring the dances which then evolve and change depending on these elements.

Pre-colonial 

Pre-colonial dances are distinctly meant to appease the Gods and to ask favors from spirits, as a means to celebrate their harvest or hunt. Their dance mimicked life forms and the stories of their community. Moreover, theses dances were also ritualistic in nature, dances articulated rites of passages, the community's collective legends and history.

Across the 7,641 islands in the Philippines, there are various tribes scattered all over, each with their own unique traditions and dances. The Igorots from the mountains of Luzon, resisted Spanish colonization and influences have kept most of their dances untouched across generations. Their dances express their love of nature and gratitude to the gods. Their choreography imitates nature and their life experiences. Dancers would often swoop their arms like birds and stomp their feet as a representation of the rumbling earth.

Spanish era 

Spanish colonist have moderated and even led the politics and economics of the country, which was mainly due to the Spanish colonialism starting from the 16th century. Despite the pre-colonial people having their of type of government, writing, myths, and traditions, several features of Hispanic culture have influenced different aspects of todays Filipino culture, from clothing, such as the barong Tagalog and the terno, to their religion even up to the dances and music.

Pre-colonial Filipinos already had their own set of music and dances before Spanish colonist came; dances were performed for different reasons, from weddings up to religious feasts, even to prepare for or celebrate war. As the Spanish colonist realized the relevance of these dances for the Natives, dancing was utilized as a relevant social activity. Some of the first dances they presented were the rigodon, Virginia, and lanceros; these were dances done for the higher class and special fiestas. Filipino dance styles like the kumintang, type of song and dance, and dances like the Pampangois, a dance distinguished for its lion-like actions and hand clapping, were pushed aside when Spanish colonist had come. However, they were later remade with influences from new Spanish dances such as the fandango, lanceros, curacha, and rigodon. Other features that were done when adopting these Hispanic dances was the addition of local elements like using bamboo, paypays (local fans), and coconut or shell castanets.

Filipinos, mainly aristocrats, have also created their own renditions of Hispanic and other European dances such as the jotas, fandangos, mazurkas, and waltzes that were done during this time. The fandango after it was introduced was recreated as the pandaggo; the same happened to the jota that was then recreated in several regions; Cariñosa and Sayaw Santa Isabel had steps that were taken from a popular dance, the waltz. Other examples would be how the rhythm and tempo of the jota and the polka influenced traditional dances like the Tinikling and the Itik-itik, which were also inspired from Southeast Asian dances. Dances that were not accompanied by Western music were also given their own accompaniments, such as the case of Pandanggo sa Ilaw.

As Hispanic and other European dances had more sharp and fast steps, Filipinos softened these movements when they were recreated. Other dances that were created during the time of hispanization would be the Danza, Jota Cagayan, Jota Isabela, Pantomina, Abaruray, Jota Manileña, Habanera Jovencita, Paypay de Manila, Jota Paragua, and the Paseo de Iloilo.

American era 
Just like in the Spanish colonization, the Americans, in 1898, had brought in their own commercial and global culture which had also influenced the Filipinos. Those with interest in dance were the ones mainly appealed to by the more Black-influenced customs of dance and music. With these Filipino dancers who already know the zarzuela (sarswela), a Spanish form of stage performance with singing and dancing and musical comedy, they became more interested in the American vaudeville (bodabil) or “stage show”, which is filled with both theatrical and circus acts, and more reminiscent of Broadway musicals. More dynamic dances were incorporated in these zarzuelas during the 1950s to the 1970s, such as the cakewalk, buck-and-wing, skirt dance, clog, tap, and soft-shoe that were more upbeat and had an American rhythm to them, as well as social dances like the Charleston, foxtrot, big apple, one-step, slow-drag, rumba, mambo, samba, cha-cha, and the Latin-influenced tango. This growth of American-influenced dances also spawned the increase of cabarets, such as the Santa Ana Cabaret which is a huge ballroom dedicated for these performances. The disco scene also grew more in the 1980s.

Known as the “Dean of Philippine vaudeville,” John Cowper had brought with him other artists when he had come. As with the growth of American influence over dance in the country, Filipinos had started creating their own dance troupes; some of these would be the Salvadors, the Roques, Sammy Rodrigues, Lamberto Avellana, and Jose Generoso to name a few. European classical ballet also gained more popularity following the American dances. Aside from creating their own groups, with the new and more advanced transportation system in the country, the Philippines was now able to be included in the international circuit, which had led to performances by international acts such as the Lilliputians with their “ballet girls” and the Baroufski Imperial Russian Circus showcasing their ballerinas. Aside from having international acts come, other talents also came to perform, with the notable one being Anna Pavlova in 1922 and performed at the Manila Grand Opera House. More international acts came to perform in the Philippines after, while some also trained Filipino dancers, one of which is Madame Luboc “Luva” Adameit who trained some of the first notable ballet dancers who had also become choreographers: Leonor Orosa Goquingo, known for her folk-inspired ballet performances (such as Filipinescas), Remedios “Totoy” de Oteyza, and Rosalia Merino Santos, a child prodigy known for doing the first fouettes in the country.

Aside from the rise of American dances and European style ballet, modern dance had also started taking form during this period in the vaudeville circuit. Ruth St. Denis and Ted Shawn, two founders of modern dance visited the Manila in 1926. Other modern dancers also performed in the country which led to some Filipinos training under this dance style. With the growing popularity of this dance style, Filipino dancers continued to mix in elements of folklore and native themes. Anita Kane produced Mariang Makiling in 1939 and it was the first full-length Filipino ballet performance. She also has other works such as Reconstruction Ballet, Mutya ng Dagat (Muse of the Sea), Inulan sa Pista (Rained-out Feast), and Aswang (Vampire), which all had Filipino motifs. Leonor Orosa-Goquingco also had native elements in her dances like Noli Dance Suite and Filipinescas: Philippine Life, Legend and Lore in Dance, which had mixed ballet and folk dances into one performance. Due to this trend, many other writers and dancers continued to connect this Western dance style with native influences, motifs, and even history.

Modern era
The Bayanihan Philippine National Folk Dance Company has been lauded for preserving many of the various traditional folk dances found throughout the Philippines. They are famed for their iconic performances of Philippine dances such as the tinikling and singkil that both feature clashing bamboo poles.

See also 
Francisca Reyes-Aquino
Leonor Orosa-Goquingco
Lucrecia Reyes Urtula
Ramon Obusan
Alice Reyes
Tinikling
Cariñosa
Maglalatik
Pangalay
Sagayan
Singkil

References

Dance in the Philippines